Bangaon Lok Sabha constituency is one of the 543 parliamentary constituencies in India. The constituency is in North 24 Parganas district  in West Bengal and is centered on Bangaon. 5 of the 7 assembly segments of No.14 Bangaon Lok Sabha constituency are in North 24 Parganas district and the Kalyani and Haringhata assemblies are of Nadia District (formerly Nabadwip loksabha constituency). As per order of the Delimitation Commission in respect of the delimitation of constituencies in the West Bengal, Bangaon Lok Sabha constituency came into being in 2009.

History

In 2009 Bangaon Lok Sabha constituency was formed. Until then Bagdah, Bongaon Uttar, Bongaon Dakshin, Gaighata all these assembly constituencies were the part of Barasat Lok Sabha constituency. Gobinda Chandra Naskar was the first elected MP of this constituency. He was also a member of West Bengal Legislative Assembly in four different terms.

Vidhan Sabha segments
Bangaon (SC) Lok Sabha constituency (parliamentary constituency no. 14) is composed of the following assembly segments

Members of Lok Sabha

Election results

General election 2019
In 2019 Election BJP won for the first time in this constituency since its delimitation.

Bye-poll 2015
The bye election occurred on 13 February 2015 due to the death of sitting MP Kapil Krishna Thakur on 13 October 2014. Mamata Thakur of Trinamool Congress defeated Debesh Das of CPIM.

General election 2014

General election 2009

|-
! style="background-color:#E9E9E9;text-align:left;" width=225 |Party
! style="background-color:#E9E9E9;text-align:right;" |Seats won
! style="background-color:#E9E9E9;text-align:right;" |Seat change
! style="background-color:#E9E9E9;text-align:right;" |Vote percentage
|-
| style="text-align:left;" |Trinamool Congress
| style="text-align:center;" | 19
| style="text-align:center;" | 18
| style="text-align:center;" | 31.8
|-
| style="text-align:left;" |Indian National Congress
| style="text-align:center;" | 6
| style="text-align:center;" | 0
| style="text-align:center;" | 13.45
|-
| style="text-align:left;" |Socialist Unity Centre of India (Communist)
| style="text-align:center;" | 1
| style="text-align:center;" | 1
| style="text-align:center;" | NA
|-
|-
| style="text-align:left;" |Communist Party of India (Marxist)
| style="text-align:center;" | 9
| style="text-align:center;" | 17
| style="text-align:center;" | 33.1
|-
| style="text-align:left;" |Communist Party of India
| style="text-align:center;" | 2
| style="text-align:center;" | 1
| style="text-align:center;" | 3.6
|-
| style="text-align:left;" |Revolutionary Socialist Party
| style="text-align:center;" | 2
| style="text-align:center;" | 1
| style="text-align:center;" | 3.56
|-
| style="text-align:left;" |Forward bloc
| style="text-align:center;" | 2
| style="text-align:center;" | 1
| style="text-align:center;" | 3.04
|-
| style="text-align:left;" |Bharatiya Janata Party
| style="text-align:center;" | 1
| style="text-align:center;" | 1
| style="text-align:center;" | 6.14
|-
|}

See also
 List of Constituencies of the Lok Sabha

References

External links
Bangaon lok sabha constituency election 2019 result details

Lok Sabha constituencies in West Bengal
Politics of North 24 Parganas district